The  is a lay-oriented Nichiren Buddhist group.

History 
The lay Nichiren Buddhist organization now known as the Kokuchūkai was founded by Tanaka Chigaku in 1880 as Rengekai ("Lotus Blossom Society") and renamed Risshō Ankokukai in 1884 before adopting its current name in 1914.

Originally based in Yokohama, the group shifted its head office to Tokyo, Kyoto-Osaka, Kamakura and Miho, Shizuoka Prefecture before finally moving back to Tokyo. The group is currently based in Ichinoe, Edogawa-ku.

Teachings 
Among the group's principal teachings are to return to the teachings Nichiren and unite the various sects of Nichiren Buddhism. The group's teachings are characterized by a strong form of Nichirenism.

Membership 
At its height in 1924, the group's membership was estimated at over 7000. The literary figures Takayama Chogyū and Kenji Miyazawa were members of the Kokuchūkai for a time. The group's official website continues to claim them, but they ultimately rejected Tanaka's nationalistic views.

Publications 

References

Works cited

External links 
Official website (Japanese)

Religious organizations based in Japan
Nichiren Buddhism
Japanese new religions
Buddhist new religious movements
1914 establishments in Japan
Japanese nationalism